T-cell surface glycoprotein CD3 delta chain is a protein that in humans is encoded by the CD3D gene.

Interactions
CD3D has been shown to interact with CD8A.

See also
 CD3 (immunology)
 Cluster of differentiation

References

Further reading

External links 
 
 
 PDBe-KB provides an overview of all the structure information available in the PDB for Human T-cell surface glycoprotein CD3 delta chain (CD3D)

Clusters of differentiation